Jonathan Trelawny may refer to:

Sir Jonathan Trelawny (High Sheriff of Cornwall), Member of Parliament for Liskeard and Cornwall
Sir Jonathan Trelawny, 2nd Baronet (c. 1623–1681), his grandson, Member of Parliament for East Looe, Cornwall and Liskeard
Jonathan Trelawny (MP for West Looe), of Plymouth, MP for West Looe (UK Parliament constituency) 1677–1685 and 1690–1695
Sir Jonathan Trelawny, 3rd Baronet (1650–1721), Bishop of Bristol, Exeter and Winchester